Isham Stewart, sometimes written as Isom Stewart, was a state legislator in Mississippi. He served in the Mississippi House of Representatives during the Reconstruction era and also served in the Mississippi Senate. He was the target of attacks from newspapers critical of African American politicians as well as so-called scalawags and carpetbaggers. His son served as deputy sheriff and was prosecuted under a law intended to target Ku Klux Klan members. His son Robert served as postmaster in Macon, Mississippi.

Stewart was one of the first black legislators in Mississippi, he was photographed. He represented Noxubee County.

He served as a delegate to the constitutional convention and signed Mississippi's Reconstruction era 1868 constitution.

See also
African-American officeholders during and following the Reconstruction era

References

External links
Findagrave entry

19th-century American politicians
Members of the Mississippi House of Representatives
African-American politicians during the Reconstruction Era